The 1976–77 season was the 53rd season in the existence of AEK Athens F.C. and the 18th consecutive season in the top flight of Greek football. They competed in the Alpha Ethniki, the Greek Cup and the UEFA Cup. The season began on 15 September 1976 and finished on 26 June 1977.

Overview

The vision that Loukas Barlos had left in the hands of František Fadrhonc was beginning to take shape. Barlos, according to his usual strategy, increasingly enriched the galaxy of stars in the club's roster. The experienced goalkeeper, Nikos Christidis and the diligent shooter and free-kick specialist, Takis Nikoloudis were integrated in the team of Fadrhonc, both coming from Thessaloniki, Aris and Iraklis respectively, while their defensive capabilities were strengthened with Babis Intzoglou from Panionios. The crowning glory of AEK, of course, was the free move of the great Thomas Mavros in their offense, after the end of the legal dispute with Panionios that kept him out of any competitive activity for a year. Fadrhonc, considering the playing intelligence and high technical qualities of Papaioannou, decided to relocate him as a "classic number 10", in order to fit all the great attackers the club had to offer.

The negative results that were occurred in matches that coincided near European games, costed AEK points that prevented them from winning the title. As a result, AEK finished 4th place with 51 points at a distance of only 3 points from the top, as the first 4 teams finished with 54, 52, 52 and 51 points, respectively. Thomas Mavros showed from the beginning a sample of his skills, by scoring with 18 goals in the league.

In the Greek Cup, AEK eliminated away from home Proodeftiki in the First Round and Iraklis in the Second Round. In the round of 16, AEK, again away from home, faced PAOK and were eliminated by a 2–1 defeat.

AEK Athens' course in the UEFA Cup

In the 1976–77 season, everything was overshadowed by the magnificent course of European AEK to the semi-finals of the UEFA Cup, which was the biggest international distinction of the club and second greatest in Greek football at a collective level at the time, after the "Green Wembley".

The draw for the first round of the UEFA Cup, brought AEK facing the Soviet club, Dynamo Moscow. The opponent was considered anything but easy, as the Dynamo players were the backbone of the Soviet national team. At Nea Filadelfeia, Dynamo started offensively, but AEK balanced the game and in the 34th minute won a foul outside the area. Nikoloudis "thunderbolt" to the yellow and black fans his "lightning" free-kicks and opened the score. AEK continued in pressuring their opponents and took the victory by 2–0. The yellow blacks entered the Central Dynamo Stadium in icy Moscow and at the end of the first half were back at the score by 1–0, while at the beginning of the second half Dynamo managed to equalize the score of the first match. The match was led to extra time, where at the 119th minute in AEK's last offensive effort, Wagner attempted a shot from the right which was blocked by Dolmatov's hand who, fortunately for AEK, was not the goalkeeper. The referee gave the undisputed penalty and Konstantinou, showing unparalleled composure, sent the ball to the right, the goalkeeper at the opposite direction and AEK Athens to the next round.

AEK entered the draw of the next round, where they were found themselves against Derby County. The opponent's size was huge considering that the creation of Brian Clough were English champion in 1972 and 1975, FA Community Shield winner of 1975 and semi-finalists at the 1972–73 European Cup. In the first match at Athens, AEK had a great performance and won 2–0. At the second leg AEK were lucky to have Lakis Stergioudas in perhaps the greatest night of his career, keeping the 0–0 at the half time. At the second half Derby opened the score, bringing AEK in distress. However, AEK increased their tempo and at the 64th minute they managed to equalize by a Nikoloudis' free-kick. AEK did not stop there, as at the 77th minute took the lead and 8 minutes later they doubled their advantage. The final 2–3 found AEK qualifying to the next round and were the first club in European tournaments' history to achieve a victory in English ground.

AEK were drawn for the third round, against Red Star Belgrade. At AEK Stadium, AEK were superior took the lead early on and after an imposing performance won with the poor 2–0. At the rematch in Belgrade, the apparent superiority of AEK in the first match was not confirmed at the beginning of the match, as the Yugoslavs were ahead from the 20th minute. AEK, managed to equalize 5 minutes later only to find themselves back in the score by 2 goals at the end of the half time. Red Star needed just one more goal to qualify, which never came, thus AEK were among the 8 best teams of the tournament.

The draw sent yet again, AEK against another English club, Queens Park Rangers. In Loftus Road, the match quickly turned into a real nightmare for AEK, as the English entered aggressively and scored 2 goals from the penalty spot, while by the end of half time, made the final 3–0. The English considered that they had a secure score for the rematch and AEK was looking for a miracle. In Greece at a hot atmosphere made by the fans, AEK entered the game doing what they knew how to do best, to attack. The efforts bear fruit after a great offensive team performance managed to equalize the score of the first leg, which sent the match to extra time. At the end of the extra time, Fadrhonc, to everyone's surprise, subbed his goalkeeper, putting the "cold" Christidis in the match knowing that the experienced goalkeeper was a cerebral player who psychologized the opponent and in training had about 70% success rate in penalty saves. AEK won 7–6 at penalty shoot-out with a block from Christidis at the final penalty that justified Fandronk and AEK were in the semi-finals.

The draw put the Italian giants, Juventus on the road of AEK to the final of the UEFA Cup. Trapattoni's club had in their roster, players such as Dino Zoff at the goalpost, Gaetano Scirea in defence, Marco Tardelli at the midfield and Roberto Bettega in offense. In Turin AEK, without having anything to lose, played with confidence and despite the fact that were losing 1–0 in the 18th minute they stare their great opponent at even managing to equalize at the 31st minute. In the second half, AEK were inattentive and the unforgiving Italians punished them with 3 goals that made the final 4–1. At the rematch, AEK played their attractive football, but did not succeed in a yet another miracle, as they lost by 0–1 ending their great European journey.

Players

Squad information

NOTE: The players are the ones that have been announced by the AEK Athens' press release. No edits should be made unless a player arrival or exit is announced. Updated 30 June 1977, 23:59 UTC+3.

Transfers

In

Notes

 a.  AEK gave Panionios ₯10,000,000 in an out-of-court settlement between the two clubs. Τhe amount received was ₯1,500,000 in cash and the remaining ₯8,500,000 in two-year bills.

Out

Renewals

Overall transfer activity

Expenditure:  ₯0

Income:  ₯0

Net Total:  ₯0

Pre-season and friendlies

Alpha Ethniki

League table

Results summary

Results by Matchday

Fixtures

Greek Cup

Matches

UEFA Cup

First round

Second round

Third round

Quarter-finals

Semi-finals

Statistics

Squad statistics

! colspan="11" style="background:#FFDE00; text-align:center" | Goalkeepers
|-

! colspan="11" style="background:#FFDE00; color:black; text-align:center;"| Defenders
|-

! colspan="11" style="background:#FFDE00; color:black; text-align:center;"| Midfielders
|-

! colspan="11" style="background:#FFDE00; color:black; text-align:center;"| Forwards
|-

|}

Disciplinary record

|-
! colspan="17" style="background:#FFDE00; text-align:center" | Goalkeepers

|-
! colspan="17" style="background:#FFDE00; color:black; text-align:center;"| Defenders

|-
! colspan="17" style="background:#FFDE00; color:black; text-align:center;"| Midfielders

|-
! colspan="17" style="background:#FFDE00; color:black; text-align:center;"| Forwards

|}

References

External links
AEK Athens F.C. Official Website

AEK Athens F.C. seasons
AEK Athens